In the 2017–18 season, JS Kabylie competed in the Ligue 1 for the 47th season, as well as the Algerian Cup.

Competitions

Overview

{| class="wikitable" style="text-align: center"
|-
!rowspan=2|Competition
!colspan=8|Record
!rowspan=2|Started round
!rowspan=2|Final position / round
!rowspan=2|First match	
!rowspan=2|Last match
|-
!
!
!
!
!
!
!
!
|-
| Ligue 1

|  
| 11th
| 26 August 2017 
| 19 May 2018
|-
| Algerian Cup

| Round of 64 
| style="background:silver;"| Runners-up
| 28 December 2017 
| 1 May 2018
|-
! Total

Ligue 1

League table

Results summary

Results by round

Matches

Algerian Cup

Squad information

Playing statistics

|-

|-
! colspan=10 style=background:#dcdcdc; text-align:center| Players transferred out during the season

Goalscorers
Includes all competitive matches. The list is sorted alphabetically by surname when total goals are equal.

Squad list
As of August 25, 2017.

Transfers

In

Out

Notes

References

2017-18
JS Kabylie